Live in Detroit – 1984 is the second live album by the American glam metal band Black 'n Blue, released in 2002.

Track listing
 "Chains Around Heaven" - 4:51
 "Action" - 4:37
 "Autoblast" - 5:17
 "The Strong Will Rock" - 7:58
 "Hold On to 18" - 4:57
 "Wicked Bitch" - 4:36
 "School of Hard Knocks" - 6:46
 "I'm the King" - 5:28
 "One for the Money" - 6:24

Personnel
 Jaime St. James - lead vocals
 Tommy Thayer - guitars, keyboards, backing vocals
 Jeff Warner - guitar, backing vocals
 Patrick Young - bass, backing vocals
 Pete Holmes - drums

References

Black 'n Blue albums
2002 live albums